Making North America is a 2015 American documentary film which premiered nationwide on November 4, 2015. The PBS Nova film, comprising three episodes of one hour each, was hosted by Kirk Johnson (Director of the Smithsonian National Museum of Natural History); Peter Oxley directed the first episode while Gwyn Williams directed the second and third. The series describes the very beginnings and later developments of the North American continent: from the origin of planet Earth 4.54 billion years ago; to the various movements of tectonic plates and their effect on the sculpturing of the continent's land and mountains, including the Rocky Mountains, Yellowstone and the Grand Canyon; to the emergence of life on the continent and its later evolution; and, finally, to the more recent settlement of the land by humans. According to Johnson, "Most people will not have considered a time when there was no North America ... What was there before North America? How did it form? When did it start? How did it come together?"

Episodes

Participants
The documentary film is narrated by Kirk Johnson and includes the following participants (alphabetized by last name):

 Brian Atwater (U.S. Geological Survey)
 Doug Bamforth (University of Colorado)
 Chuck Bonner (fossil hunter)
 Doug Boyer (Duke University)
 Chris Goldfinger (Oregon State University)
 Carrie Howard (lead preparator)
 Kirk Johnson (narrator and Director of theSmithsonian National Museum of Natural History)
 David Loope (seismologist)
 Tyler Lyson (Denver Museum of Nature & Science)
 Patrick Mahaffy (homeowner)
 Cameron McLean (exploration manager)
 David R. Montgomery (author, The Hidden Half of Nature)
 A. B. Olevic (project superintendent)
 Bob Patten (author/flintknapper)
 Noah Planavsky (Yale University)
 Pamela Reid (University of Miami)
 Joseph Sertich (Denver Museum of Nature & Science)
 Barbara Shelton (fossil hunter)
 Scott Travis (park archaeologist)
 Joe Watkins (National Park Service)
 Lisa White (UC Museum of Paleontology)
 Emily Wolin (geophysicist)

Reception
According to James Gaines, film reviewer for LiveScience, "North America rocks. That’s what a new three-part series from NOVA shows as it explores the rich history of the continent — from glaciers in Alaska to volcanoes in Hawaii to the crystal-clear waters of the Bahamas." Joanne Ostrow, television critic for the Denver Post, writes, "Thanks to innovative special effects and graphics, this dose of earth science is visually engaging ... The graphics let us see how a slab of ocean floor diving under the earth forced the land up ... Johnson [the narrator] is enthusiastic good company, a regular guy whether rappelling into the Grand Canyon, flying over an active volcano in Hawaii, hunting for fossils in Alaska where palm trees once flourished, or descending into the palladium mines of Ontario, where geologists have dated some of the oldest rock ever found in North America ... there's much to learn from this series and, thanks to rock-solid storytelling, it's mind-blowing but easy to grasp."

See also 

 Abiogenesis
 Continental drift
 Earth science
 Evolution
 List of documentary films
 List of Nova episodes

References

External links
  at the PBS WebSite.
 .
 .
 .
 Making North America at Amazon.com
 
 Making North America – video search on YouTube.
 Making North America – video search on Dailymotion.

2015 American television episodes
2015 television films
2015 films
2015 documentary films
American documentary television films
Nova (American TV program) episodes
2010s American films